The Best of Diamond Head is a compilation album by British heavy metal band Diamond Head, released by Half Moon Records in 1999. It is the band's most comprehensive attempt at a definitive greatest hits. Although the record was released in 1999 it does not contain any material off their 1992 studio release Death and Progress. It also does not contain one of Diamond Head's most popular songs, "The Prince" (from their 1980 debut, Lightning to the Nations), which features regularly in their lives sets and is one of their more well-known songs since Metallica covered it on their Garage Inc. release.

Metallica's drummer Lars Ulrich assisted in the mixing of this album, due to Diamond Head's influence on his and James Hetfield's musical style.

Track listing

References

Diamond Head (band) compilation albums
1991 greatest hits albums